Heinz-Dieter Ebbinghaus (born 22 February 1939 in Hemer, Province of Westphalia) is a German mathematician and logician. He received his PhD in 1967 at the University of Münster under Hans Hermes and Dieter Rödding.

Ebbinghaus has written various books on logic, set theory and model theory, including a seminal work on Ernst Zermelo. His book Einführung in die mathematische Logik, joint work with Jörg Flum and Wolfgang Thomas, first appeared in 1978 and became a standard textbook of mathematical logic in the German-speaking area. It is currently in its sixth edition. An English edition of Mathematical Logic  was published in the Springer-Verlag Undergraduate Texts in Mathematics series in 1984, with a second edition in 1994 and a third edition in 2021.

Books
 Heinz-Dieter Ebbinghaus, Volker Peckhaus. Ernst Zermelo: An Approach to His Life and Work, 2007, .
 Heinz-Dieter Ebbinghaus, Jörg Flum. Finite Model Theory, 2005, .
 Heinz-Dieter Ebbinghaus, Jörg Flum, Wolfgang Thomas. Einführung in die mathematische Logik, six editions since 1978.

References

External links
Home page

1939 births
Living people
German logicians
20th-century German mathematicians
Model theorists
People from Hemer
People from the Province of Westphalia
Set theorists
20th-century German philosophers
German male writers